Yucca harrimaniae Trel., the Spanish bayonet, is a species in the family Asparagaceae, native to Utah, Nevada, Colorado, northeastern Arizona and northern New Mexico, at elevations from 1000 m to 2700 m.

Yucca harrimaniae is a small, acaulescent (stemless) species forming clumps of rosettes. Flowers are nodding (hanging downward), partly  greenish-white, partly purplish. The species is closely related to Y. sterilis (Neese & S.L.Welsh) S.L.Welsh & L.C.Higgins..

The overall species is relatively common and widespread. Two varieties, var. nana and var. sterilis, have very small and restricted ranges.

References

harrimaniae
Plants described in 1902
Flora of the Southwestern United States
Taxa named by William Trelease